
Gmina Luzino is a rural gmina (administrative district) in Wejherowo County, Pomeranian Voivodeship, in northern Poland.

Villages
Gmina Luzino contains the villages and settlements of Barłomino, Bożejewo, Charwatynia, Dąbrówka, Dąbrówka-Młyn, Kębłowo, Kębłowska Tama, Kębłowski Młyn, Kochanowo, Ludwikówko, Luzino, Milwino, Milwińska Huta, Nowe Kębłowo, Robakowo, Rzepecka, Sychowo, Tępcz, Wyszecino, Wyszecka Huta, Zelewo and Zielnowo.

Surface structure
According to data from 2004, the municipality of Luzino has an area of 111.93 km², including:

 agricultural land: 49% of the area (5048,8 ha),
 forestland: 42.4% of the area (4743 ha). The municipality constitutes 8.73% of the county's area.

Neighbouring gminas
Gmina Luzino is bordered by the gminas of Gniewino, Łęczyce, Linia, Szemud and Wejherowo.

References
Polish official population figures 2006

Luzino
Wejherowo County
Bilingual communes in Poland